The 2013–14 West Coast Conference women's basketball season began with practices in October 2013 and ended with the 2014 West Coast Conference women's basketball tournament at the Orleans Arena March 6–11, 2014 in Las Vegas. The regular season began in November, with the conference schedule starting at the end of December.

This was the 29th season for WCC women's basketball, which began in the 1985–86 season when the league was known as the West Coast Athletic Conference (WCAC). It was also the 25th season under the West Coast Conference name (the conference began as the California Basketball Association in 1952, became the WCAC in 1956, and dropped the word "Athletic" in 1989).  The conference went through significant changes this season, adding a new member for the second time in three seasons. Conference charter member Pacific, like all other WCC members founded as a faith-based institution, but now the WCC's only officially nonsectarian school, rejoined from the Big West after a 42-year absence.

Pre-season
 Pre-season media day took place on Thursday, October 24 at the Time Warner Cable SportsNet and Time Warner Cable Deportes Studios. Video interviews were hosted on the WCC's streaming video outlet, TheW.tv, beginning at 11:30 AM PDT. Jeff Lampe of WCC Live interviewed each coach and got a preview of their respective season. The regional television schedule announcement, the Pre-season Conference team, and the pre-season coaches rankings were some of the additional events that took place.

2013–14 West Coast Women's Basketball Media Poll
Rank, School (first-place votes), Points
1. Gonzaga (9), 81
2. San Diego (1), 69
3. St. Mary's, 63
4. BYU, 62
5. Pacific, 46
6. Loyola Marymount, 38
7t. San Francisco, 27
7t. Santa Clara, 27
7t. Portland, 27
10. Pepperdine, 10

2013–14 West Coast Women's Preseason All-West Conference Team
Player, School, Yr., Pos.
Zhane Dikes, San Francisco, So., G
Sunny Greinacher, Gonzaga, Jr., F
Jennifer Hamson, BYU, Sr., C
Maya Hood, San Diego, So., F
Amy Kame, San Diego, Sr., G
Danielle Mauldin, Saint Mary's, Sr., F
Jackie Nared, Saint Mary's, Sr., G
Haiden Palmer, Gonzaga, Sr., G
Hazel Ramirez, Loyola Marymount, Sr., G
Jazmine Redmon, Gonzaga, Sr., G

Rankings
The AP Poll does not do a post-season rankings. As a result, their last rankings are Week 19. The Coaches Poll does a post-season poll and the end of the NCAA Tournament.

Non-Conference games
Saint Mary's defeated Pac-12 member Washington 91–81 on November 8, 2013
San Diego defeated Pac-12 member Arizona State 61–53 on November 13, 2013
Gonzaga went on the road and nearly defeated #11 Oklahoma in the semifinals of the Women's Preseason NIT. In the end the Sooners snuck away with an 82–78 victory, but the Zags performance brought them more notice from the voters, moving them into the Top 25 in the Coaches Poll and moving them up one spot to #24 in the AP Poll.
BYU defeated ACC member Boston College 70–69 in OT on November 16, 2013

Conference games

Composite Matrix
This table summarizes the head-to-head results between teams in conference play. (x) indicates games remaining this season.

Conference tournament

  March 6–11, 2014– West Coast Conference Basketball Tournament, Orleans Arena, Las Vegas, NV.

Head coaches
Jeff Judkins, BYU
Kelly Graves, Gonzaga
Charity Elliott, Loyola Marymount
Lynne Roberts, Pacific
Ryan Weisenberg, Pepperdine
Jim Sollars, Portland
Paul Thomas, Saint Mary's
Cindy Fisher, San Diego
Jennifer Azzi, San Francisco
Jennifer Mountain, Santa Clara

Postseason

NCAA tournament

WNIT

WBI

No WCC teams participated in the 2014 WBI.

Awards and honors

WCC Player-of-the-Week

 Nov. 11 - Kendall Kenyon, F, Pacific & Jackie Nared, G, Saint Mary's
 Nov. 25 – Danielle Mauldin, F, Saint Mary's
 Dec. 9  – Sunny Greinacher, F, Gonzaga
 Dec. 23 – Jackie Nared, G, Saint Mary's
 Jan. 6  – Bria Richardson, G, Pepperdine
 Jan. 20 – Jackie Nared, G, Saint Mary's
 Feb. 3  – Jennifer Hamson, C, BYU
 Feb. 17 – Hazel Ramirez, G, Loyola Marymount
 Nov. 18 – Jennifer Hamson, C, BYU
 Dec. 2  – Danielle Mauldin, F, Saint Mary's
 Dec. 16 – Katelyn McDaniel, F, San Diego
 Dec. 31 – Danielle Mauldin, F, Saint Mary's
 Jan. 13 – Sunny Greinacher, F, Gonzaga
 Jan. 27 – Haiden Palmer, G, Gonzaga
 Feb. 10 – Jennifer Hamson, C, BYU
 Feb. 24 - Kendall Kenyon, F, Pacific

College Madnesss West Coast Player of the Week

 Nov. 10 - Jackie Nared, G. Saint Mary's
 Nov. 24 – Danielle Mauldin, F, Saint Mary's
 Dec. 8  – Bria Richardson, G, Pepperdine
 Dec. 22 – Jackie Nared, G, Saint Mary's
 Jan. 5  – Amy Kame, G, San Diego
 Jan. 19 – Jackie Nared, G, Saint Mary's
 Feb. 2  – Danielle Mauldin, F, Saint Mary's
 Feb. 16 – Jennifer Hamson, C, BYU (also High-Major Madness Player of the Week)
 Mar. 2  – Haiden Palmer, G, Gonzaga
 Nov. 17 – Jennifer Hamson, C, BYU
 Dec. 1  – Jackie Nared, G, Saint Mary's
 Dec. 15 – Katelyn McDaniel, F, San Diego
 Dec. 29 – Danielle Mauldin, F, Saint Mary's
 Jan. 12 – KiKi Moore, G, Pacific
 Jan. 26 – Kendall Kenyon, F, Pacific
 Feb. 9 – Haiden Palmer, G, Gonzaga
 Feb. 23 - Kim Beeston, G, BYU

National Player of the Week Awards
 Dec. 29– Danielle Mauldin, F, Gonzaga– ESPNW National Player of the Week (Dec. 22–28)
 Jan. 6– Amy Kame, G, San Diego– NCAA National Player of the Week (Dec. 29–Jan. 5)
 Feb. 17– Jennifer Hamson, C, BYU– NCAA National Player of the Week (Feb. 10–16)

All-Americans
Jennifer Hamson, C, BYU

All West Coast Conference teams
The voting body for all conference awards was league coaches.
Player of the Year: Jennifer Hamson, C, BYU
Newcomer of the Year: KiKi Moore, G, Pacific
Defensive Player of the Year: Jennifer Hamson, C, BYU
Coach of the Year: Kelly Graves, Gonzaga

All-Conference

Honorable Mention

All-Freshman

All-Academic

See also
2013-14 NCAA Division I women's basketball season
West Coast Conference women's basketball tournament
2013–14 West Coast Conference men's basketball season
West Coast Conference men's basketball tournament
2014 West Coast Conference men's basketball tournament

References